Caspe is a surname. Notable people with the surname include:

David Caspe (born 1978), American film and television writer
Lynda Caspe, American painter, sculptor, and poet

See also
Casper (surname)